The McAllen–Hidalgo–Reynosa International Bridge is a road bridge completed in 1926, crossing the Rio Grande between the state of Tamaulipas in northeastern Mexico and the state of Texas in the southwestern United States.

Route
The Hidalgo Texas Port of Entry is associated with the bridge that connects the cities of Hidalgo and McAllen in Texas to the city of Reynosa in Tamaulipas. 

The road bridge has two spans, north and south bound, of four lanes each. This bridge has a SENTRI Lane.

Jurisdictions
The American portion of the bridge is within Hidalgo, but is operated-maintained by the larger city of McAllen to the north. It is one of the largest operations undertaken by McAllen to date. 

Crossing the bridge north into Texas can take up to 1-2 hours at the Hidalgo Texas Port of Entry, as the U.S. border agents stop all vehicles and the lines can be very long. Recently a Secure Electronic Network for Travelers Rapid Inspection−SENTRI lane was designated, which for an extra yearly fee shortens the U.S. entry time from Mexico.

Crossing the bridge south into Tamaulipas is generally quicker, as the Mexican border agents usually check few incoming vehicles.

Since 1996, all northbound trucks are required to use the Pharr–Reynosa International Bridge to enter the U.S.

Border crossing

The Hidalgo Texas Port of Entry is located at the northern end of the McAllen–Hidalgo–Reynosa International Bridge, in the city of Hidalgo. The northbound traffic is coming from the city of Reynosa.  Since 1996, all northbound trucks are required to use the Pharr–Reynosa International Bridge to enter the U.S. from Reynosa.

See also
 Anzalduas International Bridge — next Reynosa + McAllen road bridge upriver-west.
 Pharr-Reynosa International Bridge — 2nd downriver between the cities, for trucks.

References

International bridges in Texas
International bridges in Tamaulipas
Road bridges in Texas
Toll bridges in Mexico
Toll bridges in Texas
Bridges completed in 1926
Reynosa
Buildings and structures in Hidalgo County, Texas
Transportation in McAllen, Texas
Transportation in Hidalgo County, Texas
1926 establishments in Texas
1926 establishments in Mexico
20th-century architecture in Mexico
1920s architecture in the United States